Sarjit Bains is the controversial UK-based film director of Punjabi Indian extraction.

His debut feature film Triads, Yardies and Onion Bhajees (2003) caused an unprecedented furore when Ealing Southall (West London) MP Piara Khabra demanded the film be banned. Subsequently, the film was only screened in independent and arthouse theatres.

His second feature Cash and Curry, starring Ameet Chana and Pooja Shah, was completed in 2008 and was released in 2010 in the UK and Ireland.

Awards and film festivals 
 Cannes Film Festival - UK Pavilion Screening Triads, Yardies and Onion Bhajees (2003)
 Bite The Mango Film Festival Triads, Yardies and Onion Bhajees (2004)
 Black History Month - Far Out, Far East Film Festival Triads, Yardies and Onion Bhajees (2004)
 Promax Awards Two-time winner

Filmography 
 Cash and Curry - Director (2007)
 Triads, Yardies and Onion Bhajees - Director (2003)

External links 
 
 Sarjit's website

British people of Indian descent
Living people
Punjabi people
Punjabi-language film directors
British film directors
Year of birth missing (living people)